Paul Bester (born 5 October 1974) is a South African cricketer. He played in one first-class and one List A match for Eastern Province in 1993/94.

See also
 List of Eastern Province representative cricketers

References

External links
 

1974 births
Living people
South African cricketers
Eastern Province cricketers
Cricketers from Johannesburg